Port of Tallinn is the biggest port authority in Estonia. Taking into account both cargo and passenger traffic, it is one of the largest port enterprises of the Baltic Sea.

Port of Tallinn is a publicly listed company managing five constituent ports (two of them in Tallinn):
Tallinn Passenger Port / Old City Harbour (Vanasadam) – the main passenger harbour in Estonia; located in the centre of Tallinn; one of the busiest passenger ports of the Baltic Sea
Muuga Harbour – the largest cargo harbour in Estonia, located in Maardu, 13 km northeast of Tallinn city centre
Paldiski South Harbour – a cargo harbour in Paldiski, 40 km west from Tallinn
Paljassaare Harbour – a small cargo harbour a few kilometres northwest of Tallinn city centre in Paljassaare
Saaremaa Harbour – a passenger harbour on the island of Saaremaa, in Ninase

In October 2016, the Port of Tallinn subsidiary TS Laevad took over operation of the ferry routes between the Estonian mainland and the islands of Saaremaa and Hiiumaa.

Under the subsidiary, OÜ TS Shipping, the Port of Tallinn owns and operates icebreaker MSV Botnica.

On 29 September 2017, at the EU Digital Summit in Tallinn, a partnership of Ericsson, Intel and Telia Estonia announced that they had implemented the first live public 5G network in Europe at the Tallinn Passenger Port to connect with Tallink cruise ships at the port.

In 2018, the company was listed in Tallinn Stock Exchange. It was the first time in nearly 20 years in Estonia when a state-owned company went public in Estonia. It was also the 2nd largest IPO in Nasdaq Tallinn in the number of retail investors participating. The Republic of Estonia remains as the largest shareholder and holds 67% of the company.

References

External links

1992 establishments in Estonia
Organizations established in 1992
Tallinn
Tallinn
Buildings and structures in Tallinn
Economy of Tallinn
Organizations based in Tallinn
Geography of Tallinn
Populated coastal places in Estonia
Companies listed on Nasdaq Tallinn